Nakakura (written: 中倉 or 中蔵) is a Japanese surname. Notable people with the surname include:

, Japanese shogi player
, Japanese shogi player
, Japanese kendoka, iaidoka and aikidoka
, Japanese mixed martial artist

Japanese-language surnames